Farny is a surname. Notable people with the surname include:

Andreas Farny (born 1992), German ice hockey player
Arnold Droz-Farny (1856–1912), Swiss mathematician
Henry Farny (1847–1916), American painter and illustrator

See also
Fanny (name)